Great Britain Men's national floorball team represents Great Britain in Floorball. It is controlled by the United Kingdom Floorball Federation, which is a member of the International Floorball Federation. The squad participated in the World Floorball Championships qualification tournament numerous times but never qualified into the final tournament.

References

External links
 Great Britain men's national team page at IFF webpage

See also 

Men's national floorball teams